This is an alphabetical list of articles related to the U.S. State of Colorado.

0–9 
 .co.us – Internet second-level domain for the State of Colorado
 4 Corners
 4 Corners Monument
 6th Principal Meridian
 10-mile Range
 10th Mountain Division (United States)
 16th Street Mall
 25th meridian west from Washington
 32nd meridian west from Washington
 37th parallel north
 38th parallel north
 39th parallel north
 40th parallel north
 41st parallel north
 64 counties of the State of Colorado
 100 km isolated peaks of Colorado
 103rd meridian west
 104th meridian west
 105th meridian west
 106th meridian west
 107th meridian west
 108th meridian west
 109th meridian west
 1500 meter prominent peaks of Colorado
 4000 meter peaks of Colorado
 5280 magazine website
 14,000-foot peaks of Colorado

A 

 Adams County, Colorado
 Adams-Onís Treaty of 1819
 Adjacent States:  (seven, the third most of the 50 states)
 
 
 
 
 
 
 
 Airports of Colorado
 Alamosa County, Colorado
 Sidney Altman
 Colorado in the American Civil War
 American Ranch massacre
 Amusement parks in Colorado
 Ancestral Puebloans - Native Americans
 Antilocapra americana
 Aquamarine - Colorado state gemstone
 Aquaria in Colorado
 commons:Category:Aquaria in Colorado
 Aquilegia coerulea - Colorado state flower
 Arapaho Nation of Native Americans
 Arapahoe County, Colorado
 Arapahoe County, Kansas Territory
 Arrappahoe County, Jefferson Territory
 Arboreta in Colorado
 commons:Category:Arboreta in Colorado
 Archuleta County, Colorado
 Arkansas River
 Early history of the Arkansas Valley in Colorado
 Art museums and galleries in Colorado
 commons:Category:Art museums and galleries in Colorado
 Astronomical observatories in Colorado
 commons:Category:Astronomical observatories in Colorado
 Attorney General of the State of Colorado website
 Aurora, Colorado

B 
 Baca County, Colorado
 Battle of Beecher Island
 Battle of Julesburg
 Battle of Summit Springs
 Ballot measures of Colorado
 Beaver County, Utah Territory
 Charles Bent
 William Bent
 Bent County, Colorado
 Blue grama - Colorado state grass
 Boards of cooperative educational services in Colorado website
 Botanical gardens in Colorado
 commons:Category:Botanical gardens in Colorado
 Boulder County, Colorado
 Bouteloua gracilis - Colorado state grass
 Broderick County, Kansas Territory
 City and County of Broomfield, Colorado
 Margaret Brown
 Mary Babnik Brown
 Buildings and structures in Colorado
 commons:Category:Buildings and structures in Colorado

C 

 Calamospiza melanocorys - Colorado state bird
 Calhan Paint Mines Archeological District
 Camp Carson
 Camp Collins
 Camp Hale
 Ben Nighthorse Campbell
 Capital of the State of Colorado website
 commons:Category:Denver, Colorado
 Capitol of the State of Colorado website
 commons:Category:Colorado State Capitol
 Carbonate County, Colorado
 Scott Carpenter
 Kit Carson
 Thomas Cech
 Choirs in Colorado
 Census designated areas of Colorado
 Census statistical areas of Colorado
 Centennial State - Colorado state nickname
 Chaffee County, Colorado
 Don Cheadle
 Cheyenne County, Colorado
 Cheyenne County, Jefferson Territory
 Cheyenne Nation of Native Americans
 Chronology of the Colorado Constitution
 Chrysemys picta bellii - Colorado state reptile
 Cities - see List of municipalities in Colorado
 List of city nicknames in Colorado
 Civil War military units from Colorado
 Clear Creek County, Colorado
 Climate of Colorado
 Climate change in Colorado 
 CO – United States Postal Service postal code for the State of Colorado
 Coal mining in Colorado
 Colleges and universities in Colorado
 commons:Category:Universities and colleges in Colorado

 Colorado website
 :Category:Colorado
 commons:Category:Colorado
 commons:Category:Maps of Colorado
 Colorado Air National Guard website
 Colorado Amendment 20
 Colorado Army National Guard website
 Colorado Aviation Hall of Fame
 Colorado blue spruce - Colorado state tree
 Colorado breweries
 Colorado census designated places
 Colorado census statistical areas
 Colorado cities and towns
 List of city nicknames in Colorado
 Colorado City, territorial capital 1862
 Colorado Convention Center
 Colorado counties
 Colorado counties ranked by per capita income
 List of counties in Colorado
 Colorado Court of Appeals
 Colorado drainage basins
 Colorado Eastern Plains
 Colorado Education Association
 Colorado Engineering Experiment Station, Inc.
 Colorado forts
 Colorado Front Range
 Colorado General Assembly
 Colorado ghost towns
 Colorado Governor's Mansion
 Colorado hairstreak butterfly - Colorado state insect
 Colorado House of Representatives
 Colorado in the American Civil War
 Colorado Labor Wars
 Colorado Lottery website
 Colorado lunar sample displays
 Colorado Media School
 Colorado metropolitan areas
 Colorado Mineral Belt
 Colorado Mining Association
 Colorado municipalities
 Colorado municipalities by county
 commons:Category:Cities in Colorado
 Colorado orogeny
 Colorado Parks and Wildlife website
 commons:Category:State parks of Colorado
 Colorado Piedmont
 Colorado places
 Colorado places ranked by per capita income
 Colorado Plateau
 Colorado poetry fellowship
 Colorado professional sports teams
 Colorado Public Radio
 Colorado Public Utilities Commission website
 Colorado River
 Colorado River Water Conservation District
 Colorado Scenic and Historic Byways
 Colorado School of Mines website
 Colorado Senate
 Colorado Silver Boom
 Colorado Springs, Colorado
 Colorado State Capitol website
 commons:Category:Colorado State Capitol
 Colorado State Fair website
 Colorado State Forest website
 Colorado state government website
 Colorado state highways website
 Colorado State Patrol website
 Colorado state prisons
 Colorado state representatives
 Colorado state senators
 Colorado state symbols website
 Colorado state tartan website
 Colorado State University website
 Colorado Supreme Court
 Colorado War
 Colorado Water Trust
 Colorado wine
 Colorado-Big Thompson Project
 Columbine High School massacre of 1999
 Columbine Mine massacre of 1927
 Columbine State
 Comanche Nation of Native Americans website
 Community colleges of Colorado website
 commons:Category:Universities and colleges in Colorado
 Companies in Colorado
 :Category:Companies based in Colorado
 Edward Condon
 Conejos County, Colorado
 Congressional districts of Colorado
 Constitution of the State of Colorado website

 Cooperative educational services in Colorado website
 Adolph Coors
 Coors Field
 Counties of Colorado website
 commons:Category:Counties in Colorado
 Court of Appeals of the State of Colorado website
 Costilla County, Colorado
 Cripple Creek miners' strike of 1894
 Crowley County, Colorado
 Custer County, Colorado

D 

 Delta County, Colorado
 Demographics of Colorado website
 :Category:Demographics of Colorado
 John Denver
 Denver, Colorado, territorial and state capital since 1867
 Denver City, capital of the extralegal Jefferson Territory 1859–1860, capital of the Colorado Territory 1861-1862 and 1867–1876
 City and County of Denver, Colorado
 Denver and Rio Grande Western Railroad
 Denver International Airport
 Denver Regional Council of Governments
 Dick's Sporting Goods Park
 Dolores County, Colorado
 Dominguez-Escalante Expedition, 1776
 Douglas County, Colorado
 Drainage basins of Colorado website

E 
 Eagle County, Colorado
 Economy of Colorado
 :Category:Economy of Colorado
 commons:Category:Economy of Colorado
 Education in Colorado
 :Category:Education in Colorado
 commons:Category:Education in Colorado
 Dwight Eisenhower
 Mamie Eisenhower
 El Paso County, Colorado
 El Paso County, Jefferson Territory
 El Paso County, Kansas Territory
 Elbert County, Colorado
 Elections in the state of Colorado
 commons:Category:Colorado elections
 Environment of Colorado
 commons:Category:Environment of Colorado
 Execution in Colorado
 Executive branch of the government of the State of Colorado
 Executive Recycling

F 

 Festivals in Colorado
 commons:Category:Festivals in Colorado
 Films set in Colorado
 Films shot in Colorado
 Flag of the State of Colorado
 Gerald Ford
 Fort Collins, Colorado
 Fortieth parallel north
 Forts in Colorado:
 Bent's Old Fort
 Fort Carson
 Fort Collins
 Fort Garland
 Fort Logan
 Fort Lupton
 Fort Morgan
 Fort Saint Vrain
 Fort Vasquez
 Fort Lyon
 Spanish Fort
 :Category:Forts in Colorado
 commons:Category:Forts in Colorado
 Forty-first parallel north
 Fountain County, Jefferson Territory
 Four Corners
 Four Corners Monument
 Fourteeners of Colorado website
 Fremont County, Colorado
 Fremont County, Kansas Territory
 Front Range Urban Corridor

G 

 George Gamow
 Garfield County, Colorado
 Charles Gates, Jr.
 General Assembly of Colorado website
 Geography of Colorado
 Geographic regions of Colorado
 :Category:Geography of Colorado
 commons:Category:Geography of Colorado
 Geology of Colorado
 Geology of the Rocky Mountains
 commons:Category:Geology of Colorado
 Georgetown Loop
 Gilpin County, Colorado
 Ghost towns in Colorado
 :Category:Ghost towns in Colorado
 commons:Category:Ghost towns in Colorado
 Gold mining in Colorado
 Gold Rush, Pike's Peak
 Golden City, capital of the extralegal Jefferson Territory 1860–1861, capital of Colorado Territory 1862-1867
 Government of the State of Colorado website
 :Category:Government of Colorado
 commons:Category:Government of Colorado
 Governor of the State of Colorado website
 List of governors of Colorado
 Grand County, Colorado
 Great American Desert
 Great Plains
 Great Salt Lake County, Utah Territory
 Great Seal of the State of Colorado
 Green River
 Green River County, Utah Territory
 Greenback cutthroat trout - Colorado state fish
 Greenwood County, Colorado Territory
 Guadalupe County, Colorado Territory
 Gunnison County, Colorado

H 
 John L. Hall
 Heele County, Jefferson Territory
 Heritage railroads in Colorado
 Commons:Category:Heritage railroads in Colorado
 High Plains
 High schools of Colorado
 Higher education in Colorado
 Highest major peaks of Colorado
 Highest State
 Hiking trails in Colorado
 commons:Category:Hiking trails in Colorado
 Highway routes in Colorado
 Hinsdale County, Colorado
 Historic byways of Colorado
 Historic counties of Colorado
 History of Colorado
 Historical outline of Colorado
 :Category:History of Colorado
 commons:Category:History of Colorado
 Hospitals in Colorado
 Hot springs of Colorado
 commons:Category:Hot springs of Colorado
 House of Representatives of the State of Colorado
 Huerfano County, Colorado
 Hypaurotis crysalus - Colorado state insect

I 
 Images of Colorado
 commons:Category:Colorado
 Insignia of the State of Colorado website
 commons:Category:Symbols of Colorado
 Iron County, Utah Territory
 James Irwin

J 
 William Henry Jackson
 Jackson County, Colorado
 Jackson County, Jefferson Territory
 Jefferson County, Colorado
 Jefferson County, Jefferson Territory
 Jefferson Territory
 Judicial branch of the government of the State of Colorado

K 
 Kiowa County, Colorado
 Kit Carson County, Colorado
 Herbert Kroemer

L 

 La Plata County, Colorado
 Lake County, Colorado
 Lakes of Colorado
 commons:Category:Lakes of Colorado
 Lakewood, Colorado
 Landmarks in Colorado
 commons:Category:Landmarks in Colorado
 Larimer County, Colorado
 Lark bunting - Colorado state bird
 Las Animas County, Colorado
 Law enforcement agencies of Colorado
 Laws of the State of Colorado website
 Legislative branch of the government of the State of Colorado
 Lieutenant Governor of the State of Colorado website
 Lincoln County, Colorado
 Lists related to the State of Colorado:
 List of airports in Colorado
 List of ballot measures in Colorado
 List of boards of cooperative educational services in Colorado
 List of census designated places in Colorado
 List of census statistical areas in Colorado
 List of cities and towns in Colorado
 List of city nicknames in Colorado
 List of Civil War units from Colorado
 List of colleges and universities in Colorado
 List of companies based in Colorado
 List of counties in Colorado
 List of Colorado counties ranked by per capita income
 Table of Colorado counties
 List of drainage basins in Colorado
 List of dams and reservoirs in Colorado
 List of forts in Colorado
 List of ghost towns in Colorado
 List of governors of Colorado
 Governor of the Territory of Jefferson
 List of governors of the Territory of Colorado
 List of governors of the State of Colorado
 List of high schools in Colorado
 List of highways in Colorado
 List of state highways in Colorado
 List of federal highways in Colorado
 List of interstate highways in Colorado
 List of hospitals in Colorado
 List of individuals executed in Colorado
 List of insignia of the State of Colorado
 List of lakes in Colorado
 List of law enforcement agencies in Colorado
 List of lieutenant governors of Colorado
 List of metropolitan areas in Colorado
 List of military facilities in Colorado
 List of mountain passes of Colorado
 List of mountain ranges of Colorado
 List of mountains of Colorado
 List of 4000 meter peaks of Colorado
 List of fourteeners in Colorado
 List of highest mountain peaks of Colorado
 List of most isolated mountain peaks of Colorado
 List of most prominent mountain peaks of Colorado
 List of mountain peaks of Colorado
 List of municipalities of Colorado
 List of Colorado municipalities by county
 List of museums in Colorado
 List of natural forests in Colorado
 List of national grasslands in Colorado
 List of national historic landmarks in Colorado
 List of national historic sites in Colorado
 List of national historic trails in Colorado
 List of national monuments in Colorado
 List of national parks in Colorado
 List of national recreation areas in Colorado
 List of national recreation trails in Colorado
 List of National Register of Historic Places in Colorado
 List of national scenic byways in Colorado
 List of national scenic trail in Colorado
 List of national wilderness areas in Colorado
 List of national wildlife refuges in Colorado
 List of newspapers in Colorado
 List of people from Colorado
 List of places in Colorado
 List of cities and towns in Colorado
 List of forts in Colorado
 List of ghost towns in Colorado
 List of municipalities in Colorado
 List of places ranked by per capita income in Colorado
 List of post offices in Colorado
 List of power stations in Colorado
 List of prehistoric sites in Colorado
 List of professional sports teams of Colorado
 List of former professional sports teams of Colorado
 List of radio stations in Colorado
 List of railroads in Colorado
 List of Registered Historic Places in Colorado
 List of reservoirs in Colorado
 List of rivers of Colorado
 List of scenic and historic byways in Colorado
 List of school districts in Colorado
 List of ski resorts in Colorado
 List of snakes in Colorado
 List of state forests of Colorado
 List of state parks of Colorado
 List of state prisons of Colorado
 List of state representatives of Colorado
 List of state senators of Colorado
 List of symbols of the State of Colorado
 List of television stations in Colorado
 List of trails in Colorado
 List of United States census statistical areas in Colorado
 List of United States congressional delegations from Colorado
 List of United States congressional districts in Colorado
 List of United States representatives from Colorado
 List of United States senators from Colorado
 List of territorial claims and designations in Colorado
 List of watersheds in Colorado
 Logan County, Colorado
 Louisiana Purchase of 1803
 Ludlow Massacre

M 

 Maps of Colorado
 Mass media in Colorado
 Meeker Massacre
 Mesa County, Colorado
 Metropolitan areas of Colorado
 Military facilities in Colorado
 Glenn Miller
 Mineral Belt of Colorado
 Mineral County, Colorado
 Mines, Colorado School of website
 Mining in Colorado
 :Category:Colorado Mining Boom
 commons:Category:Colorado Mining Boom
 :Category:Mining communities in Colorado
 commons:Category:Mining communities in Colorado
 Coal mining in Colorado
 Construction aggregate
 Gold mining in Colorado
 Pike's Peak Gold Rush
 Petroleum
 Natural gas
 Oil shale
 Silver mining in Colorado
 Colorado Silver Boom
 Uranium mining in Colorado
 David Moffat
 Moffat County, Colorado
 Montana County, Kansas Territory
 Montezuma County, Colorado
 Montrose County, Colorado
 Monuments and memorials in Colorado
 commons:Category:Monuments and memorials in Colorado
 Mora County, New Mexico Territory
 Morgan County, Colorado
 Most isolated major peaks of Colorado
 Most prominent peaks of Colorado
 Mother of Rivers
 Mountain County, Jefferson Territory
 Mountain passes of Colorado
 commons:Category:Mountain passes of Colorado
 Mountain peaks of Colorado
 The 55 Highest major peaks of Colorado
 The 50 Most prominent peaks of Colorado
 The 50 Most isolated major peaks of Colorado
 The 53 14,000-foot peaks of Colorado
 The 55 4000 meter peaks of Colorado
 :Category:Mountains of Colorado
 commons:Category:Mountains of Colorado
 Mountain ranges of Colorado
 commons:Category:Mountain ranges of Colorado
 List of municipalities in Colorado
 List of Colorado municipalities by county
 List of city nicknames in Colorado
 List of county seats in Colorado
 commons:Category:Cities in Colorado
 Museum Store Company
 Museums in Colorado
 commons:Category:Museums in Colorado
 Music of Colorado
 :Category:Music of Colorado
 commons:Category:Music of Colorado
 :Category:Musical groups from Colorado
 :Category:Musicians from Colorado

N 

 National forests of Colorado
 Arapaho National Forest
 Grand Mesa National Forest
 Gunnison National Forest
 Pike National Forest
 Rio Grande National Forest
 Roosevelt National Forest
 Routt National Forest
 San Isabel National Forest
 San Juan National Forest
 Uncompahgre National Forest
 White River National Forest
 :Category:National Forests of Colorado
 commons:Category:National Forests of Colorado
 National grasslands of Colorado
 Comanche National Grassland
 Pawnee National Grassland
 National historic landmarks of Colorado
 commons:Category:National Historic Landmarks in Colorado
 National historic sites of Colorado
 Bent's Old Fort National Historic Site
 Sand Creek Massacre National Historic Site
 commons:Category:National Historic Sites of Colorado
 National historic trails of Colorado
 Old Spanish National Historic Trail
 Pony Express National Historic Trail
 Santa Fe National Historic Trail
 National Ice Core Laboratory
 National Mining Hall of Fame
 National monuments of Colorado
 Canyons of the Ancients National Monument
 Colorado National Monument
 Dinosaur National Monument
 Florissant Fossil Beds National Monument
 Hovenweep National Monument
 Yucca House National Monument
 commons:Category:National Monuments of Colorado
 National parks of Colorado
 Black Canyon of the Gunnison National Park
 Great Sand Dunes National Park and Preserve
 Mesa Verde National Park and UNESCO World Heritage Site
 Rocky Mountain National Park
 commons:Category:National Parks of Colorado
 National recreation areas of Colorado
 Arapaho National Recreation Area
 Curecanti National Recreation Area
 National Register of Historic Places in Colorado
 commons:Category:Registered Historic Places in Colorado
 National recreation trails of Colorado
 National scenic trail of Colorado
 Continental Divide National Scenic Trail
 National Western Stock Show
 National wilderness areas of Colorado
 National wildlife refuges of Colorado
 Alamosa National Wildlife Refuge
 Arapaho National Wildlife Refuge
 Baca National Wildlife Refuge
 Browns Park National Wildlife Refuge
 Monte Vista National Wildlife Refuge
 Rocky Mountain Arsenal National Wildlife Refuge
 Two Ponds National Wildlife Refuge
 Native American peoples of Colorado
 Natural arches of Colorado
 commons:Category:Natural arches of Colorado
 Natural gas pipelines in Colorado
 Natural history of Colorado
 commons:Category:Natural history of Colorado
 New Mexico Meridian
 Newspapers of Colorado
 Nil sine numine - Colorado state motto
 Gustaf Nordenskiöld
 North Central Colorado Urban Area
 North County, Jefferson Territory
 North Front Range Metropolitan Planning Organization website
 North Platte River

O 

 Occupational education in Colorado website
 commons:Category:Universities and colleges in Colorado
 Oncorhynchus clarki stomias - Colorado state fish
 Oro County, Kansas Territory
 Otero County, Colorado
 Ouray
 Ouray County, Colorado
 Ovis canadensis canadensis - Colorado state mammal

P 

 William Jackson Palmer
 Park County, Colorado
 Park County, Jefferson Territory
 Trey Parker
 Peketon County, Kansas Territory
 People from Colorado
 :Category:People from Colorado
 commons:Category:People from Colorado
 :Category:People by city in Colorado
 :Category:People by county in Colorado
 :Category:People from Colorado by occupation
 Pepsi Center
 Phantom Canyon (Fort Collins Area)
 Phillips County, Colorado
 Picea pungens (Colorado blue spruce) - Colorado state tree
 Pike's Peak Country
 Pike's Peak Gold Rush
 Pikes Peak
 Pitkin County, Colorado
 List of places in Colorado
 List of forts in Colorado
 List of ghost towns in Colorado
 List of populated places in Colorado
 List of populated places in Colorado by county
 List of census-designated places in Colorado
 Colorado metropolitan areas
 List of municipalities in Colorado
 List of Colorado municipalities by county
 List of post offices in Colorado
 List of statistical areas in Colorado
 :Category:Unincorporated communities in Colorado
 Platte County, Colorado Territory
 Politics of Colorado
 :Category:Politics of Colorado
 commons:Category:Politics of Colorado
 Professional sports in Colorado
 Pronghorn
 Protected areas of Colorado
 commons:Category:Protected areas of Colorado
 Prowers County, Colorado
 Public Utilities Commission of the State of Colorado website
 Pueblo County, Colorado

Q 

 Sayyid Qutb

R 

 Radio stations in Colorado
 Railroad museums in Colorado
 commons:Category:Railroad museums in Colorado
 Railroads in Colorado
 Rangeview Library District
 Regional Transportation District website
 Registered historic places of Colorado
 commons:Category:Registered Historic Places in Colorado
 Religion in Colorado
 REMP
 :Category:Religion in Colorado
 Rhodochrosite - Colorado state mineral
 Rio Blanco County, Colorado
 Rio Grande
 Rio Grande County, Colorado
 Rivers of Colorado
 commons:Category:Rivers of Colorado
 Rock formations in Colorado
 commons:Category:Rock formations in Colorado
 Rocky Mountain bighorn sheep - Colorado state mammal
 Rocky Mountain columbine - Colorado state flower
 Rocky Mountain Empire
 "Rocky Mountain High" - Colorado state song
 Rocky Mountain oysters
 Rocky Mountains
 Stuart Roosa
 Routt County, Colorado
 Karl Rove

S 

 Saguache County, Colorado
 Ceran Saint-Vrain
 Saint Charles Reservoir
 St. Vrain County, Jefferson Territory
 San Juan County, Colorado
 San Miguel County, Colorado
 Sand Creek Massacre
 Sand Creek Massacre National Historic Site website
 Sanpete County, Utah Territory
 Saratoga County, Jefferson Territory
 Scenic byways of Colorado
 School districts of Colorado
 School of Mines, Colorado website
 Scientific and Cultural Facilities District website
 Scouting in Colorado
 Seal of the State of Colorado
 Secretary of the State of Colorado website
 Sedgwick County, Colorado
 Seitz - Colorado state soil
 Senate of the State of Colorado
 Settlements - see List of populated places in Colorado
 Shoshone Nation of Native Americans
 Silver Boom of Colorado
 Silver mining in Colorado
 Sixteenth Street Mall
 Sixth Principal Meridian
 Ski resorts of Colorado website
 :Category:Ski areas and resorts in Colorado
 commons:Category:Ski areas and resorts in Colorado
 Snakes of Colorado
 Solar power in Colorado
 South Arapahoe County, Colorado
 South Central Colorado Urban Area
 South Platte River
 South Park
 Southern Rocky Mountains
 Special districts of Colorado website
 Sports in Colorado
 :Category:Sports in Colorado
 commons:Category:Sports in Colorado
 :Category:Sports venues in Colorado
 commons:Category:Sports venues in Colorado
 Sports Authority Field at Mile High
 Square dance - Colorado state folk dance
 State capital of Colorado website
 State Capitol of Colorado website
 State highways of Colorado website
 State of Colorado website
 Constitution of the State of Colorado website
 Government of the State of Colorado
 :Category:Government of Colorado
 commons:Category:Government of Colorado
 Executive branch of the government of the State of Colorado website
 Governor of the State of Colorado website
 Colorado Department of Agriculture (CDA) website
 Colorado Department of Corrections (CDOC) website
 Colorado Department of Education (CDE) website
 Colorado Department of Higher Education (CDHE) website
 Colorado Department of Human Services (CDHS) website
 Colorado Department of Military and Veterans Affairs (DMVA) website
 Colorado Air National Guard website
 Colorado Army National Guard website
 Colorado Department of Natural Resources (CDNR) website
 Colorado Division of Forestry website
 Colorado State Parks website
 Colorado Public Utilities Commission (CPUC) website
 Colorado Department of Revenue (DOR) website
 Colorado Department of Transportation (CDOT) website
 Lieutenant Governor of the State of Colorado website
 Secretary of the State of Colorado website
 Colorado Department of State (DOS) website
 Attorney General of the State of Colorado website
 Treasurer of the State of Colorado website
 Legislative branch of the government of the State of Colorado website
 General Assembly of the State of Colorado website
 Senate of the State of Colorado
 House of Representatives of the State of Colorado
 Judicial branch of the government of the State of Colorado website
 Supreme Court of the State of Colorado website
 Court of Appeals of the State of Colorado website
 State of Deseret
 State parks of Colorado website
 commons:Category:State parks of Colorado
 State Patrol of Colorado website
 State prisons of Colorado
 State representatives of Colorado
 State senators of Colorado
 Stegosaurus - Colorado state fossil
 Matt Stone
 Structures in Colorado
 commons:Category:Buildings and structures in Colorado
 Summit County, Colorado
 Superfund sites in Colorado
 Supreme Court of the State of Colorado website
 Jack Swigert
 Symbols of the State of Colorado
 :Category:Symbols of Colorado
 commons:Category:Symbols of Colorado

T 

 Table of Colorado municipalities by county
 Horace Tabor
 Taos County, New Mexico Territory
 Telecommunications in Colorado
 commons:Category:Communications in Colorado
 Telephone area codes in Colorado
 Television shows set in Colorado
 Television stations in Colorado
 Teller County, Colorado
 Tenth Mountain Division
 Territory of Colorado, 1861–1876
 Territory of Jefferson, 1859–1861
 Territory of Kansas, 1854–1861
 Territory of Louisiana, 1805–1812
 Territory of Missouri, 1812–1821
 Territory of Nebraska, (1854–1861)-1867
 Territory of New Mexico, (1850–1861)-1912
 Territory of Utah, (1850–1861)-1896
 Nikola Tesla
 Theatres in Colorado
 commons:Category:Theatres in Colorado
 Thirty-eighth parallel north
 Thirty-ninth parallel north
 Thirty-seventh parallel north
 Timberline
 Tourism in Colorado website
 commons:Category:Tourism in Colorado
 Towns - see List of municipalities in Colorado
 Trails of Colorado
 Transportation in Colorado
 :Category:Transportation in Colorado
 commons:Category:Transport in Colorado
 Treasurer of the State of Colorado website
 Treaty of Guadalupe Hidalgo of 1848

U 

 Ultra prominent peaks of Colorado
 Uncompaghre County, Colorado
 United States Air Force Academy website
 United States of America
 States of the United States of America
 United States census statistical areas of Colorado
 United States congressional delegations from Colorado
 United States congressional districts in Colorado
 United States Court of Appeals for the Tenth Circuit
 United States District Court for the District of Colorado
 United States representatives from Colorado
 United States senators from Colorado
 United States Olympic Committee
 United States Olympic Training Center in Colorado Springs
 Universities and colleges in Colorado
 commons:Category:Universities and colleges in Colorado
 University of Colorado System website
 Unsinkable Margaret Brown
 Uranium mining in Colorado
 US-CO – ISO 3166-2:US region code for the State of Colorado
 Utah County, Utah Territory
 Ute Meridian
 Ute Nation of Native Americans

V 
 Victor American Hastings Mine Disaster

W 

 Washington County, Colorado
 Washington County, Utah Territory
 Water parks in Colorado
 Waterfalls of Colorado
 commons:Category:Waterfalls in Colorado
 Watersheds of Colorado website
 Weld County, Colorado
 Western Federation of Miners
 Western painted turtle - Colorado state reptile
 "Where the Columbines Grow" - Colorado state song
 Byron White
 Carl Wieman
Wikimedia
 Wikimedia Commons:Category:Colorado
 commons:Category:Maps of Colorado
 Wikinews:Category:Colorado
 Wikinews:Portal:Colorado
 Wikipedia Category:Colorado
 Wikipedia Portal:Colorado
 Wikipedia:WikiProject Colorado
 :Category:WikiProject Colorado articles
 :Category:WikiProject Colorado members
 Wind power in Colorado
 Repopulation of wolves in Colorado
 World Heritage Sites in Colorado
 Mesa Verde National Park

X 
 Xeriscaping

Y 

 Yule Marble - Colorado state rock
 Yuma County, Colorado

Z 
 Zoos in Colorado
 commons:Category:Zoos in Colorado

See also

Colorado
Outline of Colorado
Index of Colorado-related articles
Bibliography of Colorado
Climate change in Colorado
Colorado statistical areas
Front Range Urban Corridor
North Central Colorado Urban Area
South Central Colorado Urban Area
Geography of Colorado
Geology of Colorado
History of Colorado
National Register of Historic Places listings in Colorado
Prehistory of Colorado
Timeline of Colorado history
List of cities and towns in Colorado
List of adjectivals and demonyms for Colorado cities
List of census-designated places in Colorado
List of city nicknames in Colorado
List of Colorado municipalities by county
Commons:Category:Cities in Colorado
List of counties in Colorado
Commons:Category:Counties of Colorado
List of forts in Colorado
List of ghost towns in Colorado
List of places in Colorado
Paleontology in Colorado

References

External links

Colorado state government website
Colorado information
Colorado state government
Colorado state agencies
Colorado counties
Colorado municipalities
Colorado special districts
Colorado tourism

Colorado
 
Colorado